Ectodermal dysplasia with corkscrew hairs is a skin condition with salient features including exaggerated pili torti, scalp keloids, follicular plugging, keratosis pilaris, xerosis, eczema, palmoplantar keratoderma, syndactyly, onychodysplasia and conjunctival neovascularization.

See also
 Skin lesion

References

Further reading
 
 
 

Genodermatoses
Ectoderm